William G. Clark (July 16, 1924 – August 17, 2001) was an American politician and jurist.

Born in Chicago, Illinois, Clark went to Loyola University Chicago, University of Michigan, Michigan State University, and received his law degree from DePaul University College of Law. In 1952, Clark was appointed by Illinois Governor Adlai Stevenson to be the attorney for the public administrator of Cook County, Illinois. In 1952, 1956, and 1958, Clark was elected to the Illinois House of Representatives as a Democrat and served as majority leader. In 1954, Clark was elected to the Illinois State Senate. In 1960, Clark was elected Illinois Attorney General and served until 1969. Clark then practiced law. Then, in 1976, Clark was elected to the Illinois Supreme Court and served until 1992. He served as chief justice of the Illinois Supreme Court from 1985 to 1988. Clark died in Skokie, Illinois from complications due to diabetes in 2001.

Notes

1924 births
2001 deaths
Politicians from Chicago
Loyola University Chicago alumni
University of Michigan alumni
Michigan State University alumni
DePaul University College of Law alumni
Chief Justices of the Illinois Supreme Court
Illinois Attorneys General
Democratic Party Illinois state senators
Democratic Party members of the Illinois House of Representatives
20th-century American judges
Justices of the Illinois Supreme Court
20th-century American politicians